Nasrullah Khan (born 1 March 1985) is a Pakistani footballer, who plays as the midfielder for Pakistan Airlines, he is also the captain of his team. Khan represented Pakistan from 2008 to 2009.

References

Living people
Pakistani footballers
Pakistan international footballers
1985 births
Association football midfielders